Sir Michael David Milroy Franklin, KCB, CMG (24 August 1927 – 7 June 2019) was an English civil servant. Educated at Peterhouse, Cambridge, Franklin entered the civil service in 1950; after four years in the European Commission's Directorate-General for Agriculture, he was head of the European Secretariat at the Cabinet Office from 1977 to 1981, Permanent Secretary of the Department of Trade from 1982 to 1983, and Permanent Secretary of the Ministry of Agriculture, Fisheries and Food from 1983 to 1987.

External links 

 The Papers of Sir Michael Franklin held at Churchill Archives Centre

References 

1927 births
2019 deaths
English civil servants
Alumni of Peterhouse, Cambridge
Knights Companion of the Order of the Bath
Companions of the Order of St Michael and St George